The shortfin barb (Enteromius brevipinnis) is a species of cyprinid fish native to southern Africa where it occurs in the Sabie-Komati and the Steelpoort-Limpopo river systems.  It inhabits well vegetated headwater streams.  This species can reach a length of  SL.  It can also be found in the aquarium trade.

See also
 List of freshwater aquarium fish species

References 

Enteromius
Barbs (fish)
Freshwater fish of South Africa
Taxa named by Reginald Arthur Jubb
Fish described in 1966